Michael Shea or Mike Shea may refer to:
Michael Shea (actor) (born 1952), American child/teen actor
Michael Shea (American author) (1946–2014), American fantasy/horror/sci-fi writer
Michael Shea (diplomat) (1938–2009), Scottish press secretary to Queen Elizabeth II and author
Michael Shea (ice hockey) (born 1961), Austrian ice hockey player
Michael A. Shea (1894–1954), Newfoundland politician
Michael P. Shea (born 1967), American attorney and United States district judge
Mike Shea (baseball) (1867–1927), American Major League pitcher for the Cincinnati Reds
Mike Shea (snowboarder) (born 1983), American para-snowboarder
Mike Shea (born 1966), founder, president, and CEO of Alternative Press magazine

See also
Michael O'Shea (disambiguation)
Shea (disambiguation)